Raymond Richard Chartraw (born July 13, 1954) is a Venezuelan-born American former professional ice hockey defenseman who played 420 games in the National Hockey League (NHL) between 1974 and 1984. He was a four-time Stanley Cup winner with the Montreal Canadiens. Selected tenth overall in the 1974 NHL Entry Draft, he was the first American drafted in the first round.

Chartraw was born in Caracas, Venezuela while his American father was employed there as an engineer. The family moved back to the United States when Rick was three, and he grew up in Erie, Pennsylvania. He learned to play hockey there (he was also a promising golfer) before moving to Canada as a teenager to play junior hockey for the Kitchener Rangers.

Hockey career
Rick started his NHL career with the Montreal Canadiens in 1975.  He spent seven seasons in Montreal before being traded to the Los Angeles Kings, and later played for the New York Rangers and Edmonton Oilers. Chartraw won four Stanley Cups with the Habs (1976 to 1979) and one with the Oilers (1984). He only played 24 games, and one playoff game in 1984 for Edmonton, so  did not qualify for engravement of his name on the Stanley Cup. Chartraw also played for Team USA in the 1976 Canada Cup.

Career statistics

Regular season and playoffs

International

References

External links

Chartraw at Hockeydraftcentral.com

1954 births
American men's ice hockey defensemen
Edmonton Oilers players
Ice hockey players from Pennsylvania
Kitchener Rangers players
Living people
Los Angeles Kings players
Montreal Canadiens draft picks
Montreal Canadiens players
National Hockey League first-round draft picks
New Haven Nighthawks players
New York Rangers players
Nova Scotia Voyageurs players
Sportspeople from Erie, Pennsylvania
San Diego Mariners draft picks
Sportspeople from Caracas
Stanley Cup champions
Tulsa Oilers (1964–1984) players